Statistics of Qatar Stars League for the 1972–73 season.

Overview
Al-Esteqlal won the championship.

References
Qatar - List of final tables (RSSSF)

Qatar
1972–73 in Qatari football